Navasana (Sanskrit: नावासन; IAST: nāvāsana), Naukasana, Boat Pose, or Paripurna Navasana (IAST: paripūrṇanāvāsana "Full Boat Pose") is a seated asana in modern yoga as exercise.

Etymology and origins 

The name comes from the Sanskrit words परिपूर्ण paripurna meaning "full",  नाव nava meaning "boat" and आसन asana meaning "posture" or "seat".

The pose was illustrated in the 19th century Sritattvanidhi under the name Naukāsana, also meaning boat pose.

Description 

To enter the pose from sitting, the knees are bent, and the body's weight is shifted back until the soles of the feet lift off the ground. In the pose, the body is balanced on the sitting bones, not leaning right back on to the tailbone. The spine is lengthened to broaden and lift the chest.

Preparatory poses for Navasana include the standing poses Utkatasana and Uttanasana, and the seated pose Dandasana.

Variations 

Variations include the easier Ardha Navasana ( "Half Boat Pose") with feet and body only half-raised. The more difficult Ubhaya Padangusthasana has both hands grasping the toes or feet.

References

Further reading 

 
 

Sitting asanas
Forward bend asanas
Core strength asanas